Earl of Glencairn was a title in the Peerage of Scotland. It was created in 1488 for Alexander Cunningham, 1st Lord Kilmaurs (created 1450). The name was taken from the parish of Glencairn in Dumfriesshire so named for the Cairn Waters which run through it.

On the death of the fifteenth earl in 1796, there existing no original Letters Patent of the creation nor a given remainder in the various confirmations in title of previous earls the title became dormant

The earldom was claimed by Sir Adam Fergusson of Kilkerran, Bt., as heir of line of Alexander 10th, Earl of Glencairn and was opposed by Sir Walter Montgomery Cunningham of Corshill, Bt., as presumed heir male along with Lady Henriet Don, sister of the last earl, and wife of Sir Alexander Don of Newton Don, Roxburghshire. The House of Lords Committee of Privileges on 14 July 1797, chaired by the Lord Chancellor (Lord Rosslyn), in deciding the claim of the first-named, took a view unfavourable to all the claimants, and adjudged, that while Sir Adam Fergusson had shown himself to be the heir-general of Alexander, 10th Earl of Glencairn who died in 1670, he had not made out his right to the title.  However, the decision was severely criticised by the jurist John Riddell in the 19th century and by Sir Iain Moncreiffe of that Ilk, Officer of Arms, in the 20th.

Earls of Glencairn (1488)

Alexander Cunningham, 1st Earl of Glencairn (1426–1488)
Robert Cunningham, 2nd Earl of Glencairn, According to the Scottish Code of Heraldry, the titile, Earl of Glencairn passed from father, Alexander to his son Robert, upon his death, 11 June 1488, establishing Robert Cuninghame, the 2nd Earl of Glencairn. On 17 October 1488, at the behest of King James IV, Parliament passed the Act of Recissory, annulling all dignities granted by King James III after 2 February 1488. This Act deprived Robert the title and rights granted to the Earldom of Glencairn. In 1505 Parliament passed the Act Revocatory, and on 13 August 1505 at the Wedding of King James IV to Princess Margaret of England the Earldom of Glencairn was restored upon Cuninghame Family of Kilmaurs. (Cuthbert Cuninghame, 3rd Earl of Glencairn, 3rd Lord Kilmaurs.)
Cuthbert Cunningham, 3rd Earl of Glencairn (c. 1476c. 1541)
William Cunningham, 4th Earl of Glencairn (c. 1490–1547)
Alexander Cunningham, 5th Earl of Glencairn (died 1574)
William Cunningham, 6th Earl of Glencairn (1526–1580)
James Cunningham, 7th Earl of Glencairn (1552–1630)
William Cunningham, 8th Earl of Glencairn (1575–1631)
William Cunningham, 9th Earl of Glencairn (1610–1664)
Alexander Cunningham, 10th Earl of Glencairn (died without male issue, 1670).
John Cunningham, 11th Earl of Glencairn (died 1703) succeeded his brother and matriculated the arms in 1672.
William Cunningham, 12th Earl of Glencairn (died 1734)
William Cunningham, 13th Earl of Glencairn (died 1775)
James Cunningham, 14th Earl of Glencairn (1749–1791) unmarried and died without issue; succeeded by his brother.
John Cunningham, 15th Earl of Glencairn (1750–1796) died without issue.

See also
Cunynghame baronets
Montgomery-Cuninghame baronets

Footnotes

References 
 Douglas, Sir Robert (1764), The Peerage of Scotland.
 Robertson, George, Topographical Description of Ayrshire; more Particularly of Cunninghame: together with a Genealogical account of the Principal families in that Bailiwick, Irvine, 1820.
 Brown, Peter, publisher, The Peerage of Scotland, Edinburgh, 1834, p. 88.
 Anderson, William, The Scottish Nation, vol.v, pp. 310–314: Glencairn, Earl of

 
Clan Cunningham
Noble titles created in 1488
Dormant earldoms in the Peerage of Scotland